The Jonesboro Metropolitan Statistical Area, as defined by the United States Census Bureau, is an area consisting of two counties – Craighead and Poinsett – in northeast Arkansas, anchored by the city of Jonesboro.  As of the 2010 census, the MSA had a population of 121,026 (a July 1, 2012 estimate has placed the population at 124,042). It is also part of the larger Jonesboro-Paragould Combined Statistical Area.

Counties
Craighead
Poinsett

Cities and towns

Places with more than 60,000 inhabitants
Jonesboro (Principal city)

Places with 3,000 to 10,000 inhabitants
Trumann

Places with 1,000 to 3,000 inhabitants
Bay
Bono
Brookland
Caraway
Harrisburg
Lake City
Lepanto
Marked Tree
Monette

Places with less than 1,000 inhabitants
Black Oak
Cash
Egypt
Fisher
Tyronza
Waldenburg
Weiner

Unincorporated places
Bowman
Greenfield
Herman
Lunsford
Otwell
Payneway
Pitts
Rivervale
Stacy
Whitehall

Demographics
As of the census of 2000, there were 107,762 people, 42,327 households, and 29,321 families residing within the MSA. The racial makeup of the MSA was 89.68% White, 7.63% African American, 0.31% Native American, 0.50% Asian, 0.02% Pacific Islander, 0.88% from other races, and 0.98% from two or more races. Hispanic or Latino of any race were 1.95% of the population.

The median income for a household in the MSA was $29,492, and the median income for a family was $36,473. Males had a median income of $28,500 versus $20,154 for females. The per capita income for the MSA was $15,089.

See also
Arkansas metropolitan areas
List of cities in Arkansas
List of United States metropolitan areas

References

 
Jonesboro-Paragould Combined Statistical Area